Jeffrey Jacob Walz (born October 27, 1971) is the head coach of the women's basketball team at the University of Louisville. In his second year as a head coach, he guided his team to a national championship appearance at the 2009 NCAA Division I women's basketball tournament, and led the Cardinals to a second championship game appearance in 2013.

High school
Walz attended Highlands High School in Fort Thomas, Kentucky.

College
Walz completed his undergraduate studies at Northern Kentucky, attending on a basketball scholarship. He graduated in 1995, earning a bachelor of science in secondary education, and went on to complete a master's degree at Western Kentucky in 1997 while serving as a women's basketball graduate assistant coach under Paul Sanderford.

Coaching
Walz began coaching middle school and high school teams before finishing college. His first college position was assistant to Paul Sanderford at Western Kentucky, where he coached his sister Jaime Walz, who earned Kentucky "Miss Basketball" honors in 1996.

When Sanderford moved to take the head coach position at the University of Nebraska, Walz followed him as an assistant. While at Nebraska, he helped the program go to a school record three consecutive NCAA appearances.

In 2002, Walz accepted a position as assistant to Brenda Frese (then Brenda Oldfield) at Minnesota. Frese won AP Coach of the Year honors after improving Minnesota from 8–20 to 22–8. The University of Maryland persuaded her to accept the head coaching position and Walz also made the move. He spent five seasons at Maryland, helping them to become a national power, including a national championship at the 2006 NCAA Division I women's basketball tournament.

Walz made the transition to head coach in 2007, accepting an offer from the University of Louisville. The school moved into the top 15 in attendance in his first year, averaging 6,456 fans per game, and attracting a total of 77,480 people that season.

When the women's team (along with the U of L men's team) moved to the KFC Yum! Center in 2010, attendance took another major jump. In both of the first two seasons that the Cardinals women spent at the KFC Yum! Center (2010–11 and 2011–12), the team ranked second in national attendance behind Tennessee.

Walz received a pay increase from his athletic director Tom Jurich, prior to the 2012–2013 season.

Walz took the 2012–2013 team to the national championship game, falling to UConn 93–60.

Awards and honors
2008—Maggie Dixon Award

Head coaching record

Notes

External links
 Official Biography, Louisville Cardinals

1971 births
Living people
American men's basketball players
American women's basketball coaches
Basketball coaches from Kentucky
Basketball players from Kentucky
High school basketball coaches in the United States
Highlands High School (Fort Thomas, Kentucky) alumni
Louisville Cardinals women's basketball coaches
Maryland Terrapins women's basketball coaches
Minnesota Golden Gophers women's basketball coaches
Nebraska Cornhuskers women's basketball coaches
Northern Kentucky Norse men's basketball players
Western Kentucky Lady Toppers basketball coaches